Electoral history of William Edgar Borah, United States Senator from Idaho (1907–1940)
 Chairman of the Senate Foreign Relations Committee (1924–1933)
Dean of the Senate (1933–1940)
Candidate for 1936 Republican presidential nomination

Elections
Idaho's At-large congressional district, 1896: 
 James Gunn (D/Populist) - 13,787 (47.75%)
 William Borah (Silver Republican) - 9,034 (31.29%)
 John T. Morrison (R) - 6,054 (20.97%)

United States Senate election in Idaho, 1902 (by legislature, January 14, 1903):
Republican nomination (Legislative caucus, January 7, 1903)
 Weldon B. Heyburn (R) - 28 (56%) nominated and elected over Democrat James Hawley
 William Borah (R) - 22 (44%)
 George L. Shoup (R)
 D.W. Standrod (R)

United States Senate election in Idaho, 1906 (by legislature, January 15, 1907): 
 William Borah (R) - 53 (74.6%) - elected 
 Fred Dubois (D) (inc.) - 18 (25.4%) 

1912 Republican National Convention (Vice Presidential tally):
 James S. Sherman (inc.) - 596 (55.29%)
 Abstaining - 424 (39.33%)
 William Borah - 21 (1.95%)
 Charles H. Merriam - 20 (1.86%)
 Herbert S. Hadley - 14 (1.30%)
 Albert J. Beveridge - 2 (0.19%)
 Howard F. Gillette - 1 (0.09%)

United States Senate election in Idaho, 1912 (by legislature, January 14, 1913):
 William Borah (R) (inc.) - 75 (91.5%) - elected
 George Tannahill (D) - 5 (6.1%)
 Kirtland Perky (D) - 2 (2.4%)

1916 Republican National Convention (Presidential tally):
 Charles E. Hughes - 950 (55.01%)
 John Weeks - 105 (6.08%)
 Elihu Root - 103 (5.96%)
 Charles W. Fairbanks - 89 (5.15%)
 Albert B. Cummins - 85 (4.92%)
 Theodore Roosevelt - 81 (4.69%)
 Theodore E. Burton - 78 (4.52%)
 Lawrence Yates Sherman - 66 (3.82%)
 Philander Knox - 36 (2.09%)
 Henry Ford - 32 (1.85%)
 Martin G. Brumbaugh - 29 (1.68%)
 Robert M. La Follette, Sr. - 25 (1.45%)
 William Howard Taft - 14 (0.81%)
 Thomas Coleman DuPont - 13 (0.75%)
 Henry Cabot Lodge - 7 (0.41%)
 John Wanamaker - 5 (0.29%)
 Frank B. Willis - 4 (0.23%)
 William Borah - 2 (0.12%)
 Warren G. Harding - 1 (0.06%)
 Samuel McCall - 1 (0.06%)
 Leonard Wood - 1 (0.06%)

1916 Republican National Convention (Vice Presidential tally):
 Charles W. Fairbanks - 863 (87.44%)
 Elmer Burkett - 108 (10.94%)
 William Borah - 8 (0.81%)
 Abstaining - 4 (0.41%)
 William Grant Webster - 2 (0.20%)
 Theodore E. Burton - 1 (0.10%)
 Hiram W. Johnson - 1 (0.10%)

United States Senate election in Idaho, 1918:
 William Borah (R) (inc.) - 63,587 (67.21%)
 Frank L. Moore (D) - 31,018 (32.79%)

1920 Republican National Convention (Presidential tally):

1st ballot:
 Leonard Wood - 287.5 (29.3%)
 Frank Lowden - 211.5 (21.5%)
 Hiram Johnson - 133.5 (13.6%)
 William C. Sproul - 83.5 (8.5%)
 Nicholas Murray Butler - 69 (7.0%)
 Warren G. Harding - 65.5 (6.7%)
 Calvin Coolidge - 34 (3.5%)
 Robert M. La Follette - 24 (2.4%)
 Jeter C. Pritchard - 21 (2.1%)
 Miles Poindexter - 20 (2.0%)
 Howard Sutherland - 17 (1.7%)
 T. Coleman Dupont - 7 (0.7%)
 Herbert Hoover - 5.5 (0.6%)
 William Borah - 2 (0.2%)
 Charles B. Warren - 1 (0.1%)

2nd ballot:

 Leonard Wood - 289.5 votes (29.4%)
 Frank Lowden - 259.5 votes (26.4%)
 Hiram Johnson - 146   votes (14.8%)
 William C. Sproul - 78.5 (8.0%)
 Warren G. Harding - 59 (6.0%)
 Nicholas Murray Butler -  41 (4.2%)
 Calvin Coolidge - 32 (3.3%)
 Robert M. La Follette - 24 (2.4%)
 Miles Poindexter - 15 (1.5%)
 Howard Sutherland - 15 (1.5%)
 Jeter C. Pritchard - 10 (1.0%)
 T. Coleman Dupont - 7 (0.7%)
 Herbert Hoover - 5.5 (0.6%)
 William Borah - 1 (0.1%)
 Philander C. Knox - 1   vote  (0.1%)

3rd ballot:

 Leonard Wood - 303 (30.8%)
 Frank Lowden - 282.5 (28.7%)
 Hiram Johnson - 148 (15.0%)
 William C. Sproul - 79.5 (8.1%)
 Warren G. Harding - 58.5 (5.9%)
 Calvin Coolidge - 27 (2.7%)
 Nicholas Murray Butler - 25 (2.5%)
 Robert M. La Follette - 24 (2.4%)
 Miles Poindexter - 15 (1.5%)
 Howard Sutherland - 9 (0.9%)
 Herbert Hoover - 5.5 (0.6%)
 T. Coleman Dupont - 2 (0.2%)
 Philander C. Knox - 2 (0.2%)
 James E. Watson - 2 (0.2%)
 William Borah - 1(0.1%)

4th ballot:

 Leonard Wood - 314.5 (32.0%)
 Frank Lowden - 289 (29.4%)
 Hiram Johnson - 140.5 (14.3%)
 William C. Sproul - 79.5 (8.1%)
 Warren G. Harding - 61.5 (6.3%)
 Calvin Coolidge - 25 (2.5%)
 Robert M. La Follette - 22 (2.2%)
 Nicholas Murray Butler 20 (2.0%)
 Miles Poindexter - 15 (1.5%)
 Herbert Hoover - 5 (0.5%)
 James E. Watson - 4 (0.4%)
 Howard Sutherland - 3 (0.3%)
 T. Coleman Dupont - 2 (0.2%)
 Philander C. Knox - 2 (0.2%)
 William Borah - 1 (0.1%)

United States Senate election in Idaho, 1924:
 William Borah (R) (inc.) - 99,846 (79.50%)
 Frank Martin (D) - 25,199 (20.06%)
 Eugene F. Gary (Socialist) - 554 (0.44%)

1928 Republican presidential primaries:
 Herbert Hoover - 2,045,928 (49.73%)
 Frank O. Lowden - 1,317,799 (32.03%)
 George W. Norris - 259,548 (6.31%)
 James Eli Watson - 228,795 (5.56%)
 Guy D. Goff - 128,429 (3.12%)
 Frank B. Willis - 84,461 (2.05%)
 Calvin Coolidge (inc.) - 12,985 (0.32%)
 Charles G. Dawes - 12,297 (0.30%)
 Olin J. Ross - 8,280 (0.20%)
 Unpledged - 5,426 (0.13%)
 Al Smith - 3,249 (0.08%)
 Alvan Fuller - 1,686 (0.04%)
 William Borah - 206 (0.01%)
 Others - 5,185 (0.13%)

United States Senate election in Idaho, 1930:
 William Borah (R) (inc.) - 94,938 (72.42%)
 Joseph M. Tyler (D) - 36,162 (27.58%)

1936 Republican presidential primaries:
 William Borah - 1,478,676 (44.45%)
 Alf Landon - 729,908 (21.94%)
 Frank Knox - 527,054 (15.84%)
 Earl Warren - 350,917 (10.55%)
 Stephen A. Day - 155,732 (4.68%)
 Warren Green - 44,518 (1.34%)
 Leo J. Chassee - 18,986 (0.57%)
 Herbert Hoover - 7,750 (0.23%)

1936 Republican National Convention (Presidential tally):
 Alf Landon - 984 (98.11%)
 William Borah - 19 (1.89%)

United States Senate election in Idaho, 1936:
 William Borah (R) (inc.) - 128,723 (63.36%)
 C. Ben Ross (D) - 74,444 (36.64%)

References

External links
Our Campaigns: William Borah

Borah, William